Hide-and-seek (sometimes known as hide-and-go-seek) is a popular children's game in which at least two players (usually at least three) conceal themselves in a set environment, to be found by one or more seekers. The game is played by one chosen player (designated as being "it") counting to a predetermined number with eyes closed while the other players hide. After reaching this number, the player who is "it" calls "Ready or not, here I come!" or "Coming, ready or not!" and then attempts to locate all concealed players.

The game can end in one of several ways. The most common way of ending is the player chosen as "it" locates all players; the player found first is the loser and is chosen to be "it" in the next game. The player found last is the winner. Another common variation has the seeker counting at "home base"; the hiders can either remain hidden or they can come out of hiding to race to home base; once they touch it, they are "safe" and cannot be tagged.

The game is an example of an oral tradition, as it is commonly passed by children.

Variants

Different versions of the game are played around the world, under a variety of names.

One variant is called "Sardines", in which only one person hides and the others must find him or her, hiding with him / her when they do so. The hiding places become progressively more cramped, like sardines in a tin. The last person to find the hiding group is the loser, and becomes the hider for the next round. A. M. Burrage calls this version of the game "Smee" in his 1931 ghost story of the same name.
 In the Peanuts comic strip by Charles Schulz, a variation of Sardines called "Ha Ha Herman" is played, in which the seekers call out "ha ha', and the person hiding has to respond by saying "Herman".
In some versions of the game, after the first hider is caught or if no other players can be found over a period of time, the seeker calls out a previously-agreed phrase (such as "Olly olly oxen free", "Come out, come out wherever you are" or "All in, All in, Everybody out there all in free") to signal the other hiders to return to base for the next round. the seeker must return to "home base" after finding the hiders, before the hiders get back. Conversely, the hiders must get back to "home base" before the seeker sees them and returns. The hiders hide until they are spotted by the seeker, who chants, "Forty, forty, I see you" (sometimes shortened to "Forty, forty, see you"). Once spotted, the hider must run to "home base" (where the seeker was counting while the other players hid) and touch it before they are "tipped" (tagged, or touched) by the seeker.  If tagged, that hider becomes the new seeker. Forty forty has many regional names including 'block one two three' in North East England and Scotland, 'relievo one two three' in Wilmslow, 'forty forty' in South East England, 'mob' in Bristol and South Wales, 'pom pom' in Norwich, 'I-erkey' in Leicester, 'hicky one two three' in Chester, 'rally one two three' in Coventry, ' Ackey 123' in Birmingham and '44 Homes' in Australia.

International competition 
The Hide and Seek World Championship was an international hide-and-seek competition held from 2010 through 2017. The game is a derivative of the Italian version of hide-and-seek, "nascondino"

The championship was first held in 2010 in Bergamo, Italy, as an initiative of CTRL Magazine. Though it started out as a joke, the event grew year after year. The 2016 and 2017 competitions took place in Consonno, an abandoned ghost town or "The Italian Las Vegas", located in the district of Lecco, Lombardy.

The winning team was awarded "The Golden Fig Leaf", which is biblically the symbol of hiding, referring to the story of Adam and Eve.

Yasuo Hazaki, a graduate of Nippon Sport Science University, and professor of media studies at Josai University in Sakado, Japan, had set up a campaign in 2013 to promote hide-and-seek for the 2020 Olympics in Tokyo. The game Hazaki was promoting was a slightly different traditional Japanese game, more similar to a game of tag. Hazaki contacted "Nascondino World Championship" organizers and said that "Nascondino" rules were more appropriate to be a candidate to the Olympics.

See also
Princess and monster game
Search game
Sepak Tekong

References

External links

Children's games
 
Outdoor games